In geometric measure theory the area formula relates the Hausdorff measure of the image of a Lipschitz map, while accounting for multiplicity, to the integral of the Jacobian of the map. It is one of the fundamental results of the field that has connections, for example, to rectifiability and Sard's theorem.

The multiplicity function is also called the Banach indicatrix. Note that, . We will denote by  the n-dimensional Hausdorff measure.

Theorem: If  is Lipschitz, then for any measurable ,

where

The measurability of the multiplicity function is part of the claim. The Jacobian is defined almost everywhere by Rademacher's differentiability theorem.

Theorem was proved first by Herbert Federer .

Sources

External links

Theorems in measure theory